is a railway station on the Ainokaze Toyama Railway Line in the city of Toyama, Toyama Prefecture, Japan, operated by the third-sector railway operator Ainokaze Toyama Railway.

Lines
Shin-Toyamaguchi Station is served by the Ainokaze Toyama Railway Line and is 45.6 kilometres from the starting point of the line at Kurikara.

Station layout 
Shin-Toyamaguchi Station has 2 side platforms connected by a footbridge. The station is unstaffed. 

The station area used to be a freight sorting yard for the Japan Freight Railway Company.

Platforms

Chronology
 17 June 2014: Decision to erect a new station between Toyama and Higashi-Toyama Stations.
 10 July 2019: Ministry of Land, Infrastructure, Transport and Tourism gave approval for the erection of a new station.
 2020
 13 January: Construction started on the station facilities.
 20 October—18 November: A naming competition was ran involving residents of Toyama and Toyama based fanclub members of the Ainokaze Toyama Railway.
 2022
 17 February: The new station name was determined to be "Shin-Toyamaguchi".
 12 March: Opened to business.

Surrounding area 
Japan National Route 8

See also
 List of railway stations in Japan

References

External links

 Station website (in Japanese)

Railway stations in Toyama Prefecture
Railway stations in Japan opened in 2022
Ainokaze Toyama Railway Line
Toyama (city)